Clanawley is a barony in County Fermanagh, Northern Ireland. To its east lies Upper Lough Erne, and it is bordered by three other baronies: Magheraboy to the north; Tirkennedy and Knockninny to the east. It also borders three baronies in the Republic of Ireland: Tullyhaw to the south; and Drumahaire and Rosclogher to the west.

History
The territory of Clanawley was first recorded in 1306, and derives its name from Amhlaoibh, the son of the first Maguire king of Fermanagh, Donn Carrach Mag Uidhir. This makes the MacAwleys a branch of the Maguires. The name Amhlaoibh is derived from the Norse name Olaf, which became popular in a number of Gaelic families.

Amblaoibh Mag Uidhir when he died in 1306 is noted as being the taísech (chief) of the small sept or territory of Muintir Pheodacháin. It was also spelt Clonawley and Scoticised to Glenawley during the plantation of Ulster.

List of civil parishes

Below is a list of civil parishes in Clanawley:
Boho, County Fermanagh (split with barony of Magheraboy)
Cleenish (split with baronies of Magheraboy and Tirkennedy)
Killesher
Kinawley (also partly in baronies of Knockninny, County Fermanagh and Tullyhaw, County Cavan)
Rossory (split with barony of Magheraboy)

References